Aïn El Berd District is a district (daïra) of Sidi Bel Abbès Province, Algeria.  It has a growing population due to high local birth rate and immigration from nearby villages, and has become a large daïra.

The district of Aïn El Berd includes four communes:

 Aïn El Berd (the commune)
 Makedra
 Sidi Brahim
 Sidi Hamadouche

Main settlements include:

 Aïn El Berd
 Ouled Ali
 Makedra
 Dlahim
 Sidi Hamdouche
 Sidi Brahim
 Zleifa
 Oued El Mabtouh
 Louza

Districts of Sidi Bel Abbès Province